Sir John Houblon (13 March 1632 – 10 January 1712) was the first Governor of the Bank of England from 1694 to 1697.

Early life
John Houblon was the third son of James Houblon, a London merchant, and his wife, Mary Du Quesne, daughter of Jean Du Quesne, the younger. He had nine brothers and three sisters. The Houblon family were Huguenots from Lille and he later became an elder in the French Protestant Church of London in Threadneedle Street.

His younger brother, Abraham Houblon, was also Bank of England Governor, from 1703 to 1705.  A daughter of Abraham Houblon, Anne, was married to Henry Temple, later Viscount Palmerston, in 1703. His older brother, James, an influential merchant and Member of Parliament for the City of London, was also a director of the Bank of England. Four other of his brothers were prosperous merchants.

Career
He became Sheriff of the City of London in 1689, an Alderman from 1689 to 1712, and Master of the Grocer's Company from 1690 to 1691.  He was Lord Mayor in 1695.

He was a Lord Commissioner of the Admiralty from 1694 to 1699.  It was during this time, from 1694 until 1697, that he served as inaugural governor of the Bank of England. He was again a Bank of England director from 1700, and a director of the New East India Company from 1700 to 1701.

He stood as a Parliamentary candidate for the City of London in 1701, but was defeated. Some sources state incorrectly that he was Member of Parliament for Bodmin.

Appearance on banknotes
Houblon has been commemorated by his appearance on the reverse of Series E £50 notes issued by the Bank of England. The notes were issued in 1994, the year of the Bank's 300th anniversary. The design includes an image of Houblon's house in Threadneedle Street, the site of the present Bank of England building. A new £50 note was brought into circulation in 2011, featuring James Watt and Matthew Boulton in place of Sir John Houblon. The Houblon note ceased to be legal tender on 30 April 2014.

Personal life
He married Mary Jurin in 1660, who came from a Flemish Protestant family and they had five sons and six daughters, but only two sons survived their father. They lived in a magnificent house just off Threadneedle Street on the site later occupied by the Bank of England and he also acquired a country house at High Ongar in Essex.

References

External links
Sir John Houblon 1632-1712 at the Bank of England website
The Rulers of London 1660-1689, J.R. Woodhead, on British History Online
The Friends of Charles Darwin

1632 births
1712 deaths
English bankers
Lords of the Admiralty
Sheriffs of the City of London
17th-century lord mayors of London
Governors of the Bank of England
17th-century English businesspeople
Knights Bachelor